Jasobanta Dasa (born ) was an Odia poet, litterateur and mystic. He was one of  the five great poets in Odia literature, the Panchasakha during the Bhakti age of literature. He is known for his work Prema Bhakti Brahma Gita.

Personal life 
Early life of Jasobanta is mainly sourced from the work Jasobanta Dasanka Chaurashi Agyan (Eighty-four arts of Jasobanta Dasa) by one of his disciples Sudarshan Das. He was born at village Adhanga, Jagatsinghpur, part of undivided Cuttack District. His father's name was Jagu Mallika and his mother's name was Rekha Dei. He came to Puri by the inspiration of Sri Chaitanya. He got initiated into Vaishnavism during Srichaitanya's stay in Puri.

Literary works 
A list of his known works is as below.

 Gobinda Chandra
 Prema Bhakti Brahma Gita
 Siba Swarodaya

References 

Poets from Odisha
Indian male poets
Odia-language poets
Odia people
15th-century Indian poets
Devotees of Jagannath
1487 births
Odissi music composers
Vaishnava saints
15th-century Hindu religious leaders